Azygophleps confucianus is a moth in the family Cossidae. It is found in China (south-eastern Tibet, north-western Sichuan, Yunnan, Guizhou, Qinghai).

References

External links

Moths described in 2006
Endemic fauna of China
confucianus